Oscar Mario Araúz Soleto (born August 23, 1980 in Santa Cruz de la Sierra) is a retired Bolivian football striker. Also known as "Pony", Araúz has played for Destroyers, Blooming, The Strongest, Real Mamoré and Guabirá in his professional career.

References
Tras su continuidad at eldeber.com.bo
Oscar "Pony" Araúz Soleto se puso la camiseta del "turbión beniano" at futbolistasbol.com

External links
 
 

1980 births
Living people
Sportspeople from Santa Cruz de la Sierra
Bolivian footballers
Association football forwards
Club Destroyers players
Club Blooming players
The Strongest players
Municipal Real Mamoré players
Guabirá players